The Heartbreak Kid may refer to:

Films
 The Heartbreak Kid (1972 film), an American film starring Charles Grodin and Cybill Shepherd
 The Heartbreak Kid (1993 film), an Australian film starring Claudia Karvan and Alex Dimitriades
 The Heartbreak Kid (2007 film), an American film starring Ben Stiller and Malin Akerman

Other
 A 1974 song by Bo Donaldson and the Heywoods
 A 1987 song by Icehouse from their album Man of Colours
 Shawn Michaels or the Heartbreak Kid, professional wrestler